Rehmat Khaliq is a Pakistani politician who is member  of the Gilgit Baltistan Assembly. He took oath on 25 November 2020.

Political career

Rehmat  contested 2020 Gilgit-Baltistan Assembly election on 15 November 2020 from constituency GBA-17 (Diamer) on the ticket from Jamiat Ulema-e-Islam (F). He won the election by the margin of 263 votes over the PTI candidate Haider Khan. He secured 5389 votes but runnerup candidate Haider Khan secured 5126 votes.

References 

Living people
Gilgit-Baltistan MLAs 2020–2025
Year of birth missing (living people)
Jamiat Ulema-e-Islam (F) politicians